Farsantes is a 2013 Argentine legal drama. The main actors are Julio Chávez, Facundo Arana, Griselda Siciliani, Benjamín Vicuña and Alfredo Casero.

Premise
Farsantes is a legal drama concerning a law firm located in Greater Buenos Aires. It fills the timeslot of the telenovela Sos mi hombre. It was initially conceived as a miniseries, but as the host show Showmatch did not have a 2013 edition, it was expanded into a regular telenovela. The series is written by Mario Segade and Carolina Aguirre and directed by Daniel Barone and Jorge Bechara.

The cast is composed of many notable actors, including Julio Chávez, Griselda Siciliani, Benjamín Vicuña, Leonor Manso, Gabriela Toscano and Facundo Arana. Arana received proposals from both El Trece and Telefe. Telefe had proposed that he work in a telenovela with Pablo Echarri; he finally chose to work for El Trece. Actors Gonzalo Heredia and Joaquín Furriel were proposed as cast members during the early stages of production, but declined to stay in the project. Furriel's character was finally played by Benjamín Vicuña.

Actress Griselda Siciliani suffered a bone fracture during filming. Facundo Arana, who was being filmed struggling with a pair of extras and with Siciliani next to him, pushed her by accident. She was taken to the hospital "Sanatorio de la Trinidad", and received an orthopedic cast for a couple of months. The actress confirmed that the fracture was the result of an accident, and subsequent filming managed to hide her orthopedic cast.

Plot
Guillermo Graziani (Julio Chávez) is a lawyer who establishes a new law firm in the Greater Buenos Aires, after serving a time unable to work as a lawyer. He is gay, but stays married with Ana (Ingrid Pelicori) to conceal his homosexuality. He has a crush on fellow lawyer Pedro (Benjamín Vicuña), who is married to Camila (Julieta Cardinali). Alberto Marini (Facundo Arana) is a former prisoner, and the other lawyers of the firm are Marcos (Alfredo Casero) and Gabriela (Griselda Siciliani).

Reception
The 2013 prime time of Argentine television is highly disputed by the channels El Trece and Telefe. El Trece airs Solamente Vos and Farsantes, and Telefe airs Los Vecinos en Guerra and Celebrity Splash!, both channels with similar ratings.

Awards
 2013 Tato Awards
 Best direction in fiction (Daniel Barone)
 Best production in fiction
 Best lead actor in drama (Julio Chávez)
 Best daily fiction
 2013 Martín Fierro Awards
 Golden Martín Fierro Award
 Best daily fiction
 Best actor of daily drama (Julio Chávez)
 Best actress of daily drama (Griselda Siciliani)

Nominations
 2013 Martín Fierro Awards
 Best actor of daily drama (Alfredo Casero)
 Best actor of daily drama (Benjamín Vicuña)
 Best actor of daily drama (Facundo Arana)
 Best secondary actor (Mario Pasik)
 Best secondary actress (Julieta Zylberberg, Vivian El Jaber)
 Best new actor or actress (María Luján Lamas)
 Best scripts
 Best director
 Best opening theme

Cast

Main actors
 Julio Chávez as Guillermo Graziani
 Facundo Arana as Alberto Marini
 Griselda Siciliani as Gabriela Soria
 Benjamín Vicuña as Pedro Beggio †
 Alfredo Casero as Marcos Labrapoulos

Secondary actors
 Leonor Manso as Aída
 Edda Díaz as Cuca
 Mario Pasik as Miguel Ángel
 Ingrid Pelicori as Ana
 Julieta Zylberberg as Sonia
 Julieta Cardinali as Camila
 Pilar Gamboa as Paola
 Romina Ricci as Nancy
 Chino Darín as Fabián
 Vivian El Jaber as Isabel
 Esteban Lamothe as Antonio

References

External links
 Official site 
 

2013 telenovelas
Argentine police procedural television series
Pol-ka telenovelas
2013 Argentine television series debuts
Golden Martín Fierro Award winners
Fictional lawyers
Argentine LGBT-related television shows
2014 Argentine television series endings
Television shows set in Buenos Aires
Gay-related television shows
2010s LGBT-related drama television series